Dover Township is a township in Griggs County, North Dakota, United States.

Demographics
Its population during the 2010 census was 46.

Location within Griggs County
Dover Township is located in Township 144 Range 61 west of the Fifth principal meridian.

References

Townships in Griggs County, North Dakota